Margaret Preece is an English operatic soprano. She trained at the Royal Scottish Academy of Music and Drama and the National Opera Studio. Originally from Solihull, she has worked with English National Opera, Scottish Opera, Opera North and the Carl Rosa Company. In 2007 she starred in the high-profile West End revival of The Sound of Music as the Mother Abbess, replacing Lesley Garrett.

In 2008 Margaret Preece released an album called Isn't It Romantic, which features 17 songs by Richard Rodgers with lyrics by both Lorenz Hart and Oscar Hammerstein, including Isn't It Romantic?.

Following the closure of The Sound Of Music, she played Vava in Opera North's production of Paradise Moscow in spring 2009. There were performances in Leeds, Newcastle, Salford (the Lowry), Nottingham and Bregenz. In the summer, Preece reprised her role as the Mother Abbess in the UK Tour of The Sound of Music, including performances at the Wales Millennium Centre.

Theatre and opera
 Varochka and Vava in Paradise Moscow (spring 2009)
 Sister Sophia and Mother Abbess in The Sound of Music
 Donna Elvira and Zerlina in Don Giovanni
 Fiordiligi and Despina in Così fan tutte
 The Queen of the Night and Papagena in The Magic Flute
 Adina in L'Elisir D'Amore
 Alice Ford in Falstaff
 Musetta in La bohème
 Ninetta in The Love for Three Oranges
 Rosalinda in Die Fledermaus
 Clarice and Flamina in Il mondo della luna
 Oriana in Amadigi
 Susan Cooper in Love Life
 Mary Turner in Of Thee I Sing
 Carlotta in The Phantom of the Opera
 Bacchae and Hanna Glawari in The Merry Widow

Film  
The Phantom of the Opera as the Confidante and singing Carlotta, over-dubbing for Minnie Driver (who is a trained singer but has no training in opera). Her name is in the credits.

References

External links 

 

Year of birth missing (living people)
Living people
English stage actresses
English film actresses
English operatic sopranos
Alumni of the Royal Conservatoire of Scotland
21st-century British women opera singers